Gaslaternen-Freilichtmuseum Berlin (English: Gas Lantern Open-Air Museum Berlin) a permanent exhibition of historical gas lanterns in Tiergarten park in Berlin, Germany.

History

Gas lantern history  
Gas lanterns were used in Germany in 25 different cities, between 1826 until 1956. In 1826, the first gas lanterns were introduced to Germany with a contract by Imperial Continental Gas Association (ICGA), importing British-made Camberwell lanterns.

Museum history 
The museum was started in 1978. The founding leadership for the museum was the Senate of Berlin's Department for Urban Development and Housing, in cooperation with the GASAG Berliner Gaswerke Aktiengesellschaft (English: Berlin Gas Works Corporation) and its supported by the Gaslight Culture Society. At its time of opening, the museum had 31 gas lanterns from all over Germany. In 2006, many of the lanterns were painted and cleaned up, and informational signs were added, prior to the 2006 FIFA World Cup. By 2009, the collection of gas lanterns grew to 90 objects.

In recent years, many of the gas lanterns have been moved to the German Museum of Technology (German: Deutsches Technikmuseum) in Kreuzberg, Berlin to get restored.

See also 

 List of museums and galleries in Berlin

References

External links 

 Berlin's Gaslight Culture Society

Museums in Berlin
Tourist attractions in Berlin
History museums in Germany
1978 establishments in Germany